Phulchhari or Fulchhari is an upazila of Gaibandha District in the Division of Rangpur, Bangladesh.

Geography
It has 22193 households and total area 306.53 km2.

Demographics
As of the 1991 Bangladesh census, Phulchhari has a population of 128845. Males constitute 50.82% of the population, and females 49.18%. This Upazila's eighteen up population is 54806. Phulchhari has an average literacy rate of 16.5% (7+ years), and the national average of 32.4% literate.

Administration
Phulchhari Upazila is divided into seven union parishads: Erendabari, Fazlupur, Phulchari, Gazaria, Kanchipara, Udakhali, and Uria. The union parishads are subdivided into 80 mauzas and 85 villages.

See also
Upazilas of Bangladesh
Districts of Bangladesh
Divisions of Bangladesh

References

Upazilas of Gaibandha District